Season twenty-eight of the television program American Experience aired on the PBS network in the United States on January 19, 2016 and concluded on November 1, 2016. The season contained eight new episodes and began with the film Bonnie & Clyde.

Episodes

References

2016 American television seasons
American Experience